Black women are women of sub-Saharan African and Afro-diasporic descent, as well as women of Australian Aboriginal and Melanesian descent. The term 'Black' is a racial classification of people, the definition of which has shifted over time and across cultures. As a result, the term 'Black women' describes a wide range of cultural identities with several meanings around the world.

Intersectionality and misogynoir

Kimberlé Williams Crenshaw developed the theory of intersectionality, which highlighted the overlapping discrimination faced by Black women (on the basis of both race and gender) in the United States. The theory has been influential in the fields of feminism and critical race theory as a methodology for interpreting the ways in which overlapping social identities relate to systems of oppression. More recently the term misogynoir has been created to describe the specific effect of intersectionality on Black women. Misogynoir is the term that is used to describe the overlapping cases of misogyny and racism. Examples of misogynoir experienced by Black women include the stereotype of the angry Black woman and vulnerability to sex trafficking among others. These more specific terms were created as Black women have been historically left out of movements for both racial justice and feminist equality.

Around the world

Africa

The 2003 Maputo Protocol on women's rights in Africa set the continental standard for progressive expansion of women's rights. It guarantees comprehensive rights to women including the right to take part in the political process, to social and political equality with men, improved autonomy in their reproductive health decisions, and an end to female genital mutilation.

Ghana 
Women play a modest role in Ghana's two major political parties, the National Democratic Congress (NDC) and New Patriotic Party (NP), as well as in the Convention People's Party (CPP). The first president, Kwame Nkrumah (CPP), made Ghana the first African nation to introduce a quota in 1959, reserving 10 seats for women in Parliament. Ghana has recently been laggard, however, with a representation of 11% women after the election in 2012 and 13% after the election in 2016.

Tunisia
In Tunisia Black women are victims of double discrimination, facing prejudice both because of their gender and race. Testimonial evidences complied by the Tunis-branch of Rosa Luxemburg Foundation presented cases of Black women being "stigmatised, hyper-sexualised, and objectified" It has been noted that this sexualization of Black Tunisian women leads to them being viewed as objects by Arab men to "achieve sexual satisfaction" and face sexual harassment.

The feminist movement in the Arab world—including Tunisia—has been labelled as racist, failing to take into consideration the issues of women that are not Arab; this has led to parallels between Arab feminism and White feminism. In 2020, four Black Tunisian women created the Facebook group Voices of Tunisian Black Women in an attempt to bring to light these issues affecting them, which they felt were not being discussed in the Me Too movement.

Caribbean

Caribbean society
Jennifer Palmer argues that in the plantation world of the colonial Caribbean, women of color were typically treated as property owned by White men. In the French islands, race and gender shape popular assumptions about who could own property. However there were legal loopholes that sometimes opened up windows of opportunity for women of color to be landowners.

United States

American slavery

Black slaves, many of whom were women, were often abused by their owners and other White people. This abuse extended beyond the physical and psychological abuse directly related to how slaves were treated, and include the exploitation of Black women slaves in order to advance different scientific practices and techniques. Black female slaves were sexually abused by White men and were forced to breed with their White male slave masters to bear mulatto children to maintain White supremacy, have more slaves to pick cotton and produce superior slaves in the South. Black female slaves received the same treatment in Brazil, Central America, Mexico, Peru and the Caribbean. An example of this is former president and slave owner Thomas Jefferson who fathered mixed-race children with Sally Hemings. Black slave women and their bodies were also fetishized by their white male slave owners.

Increased risk for health problems 
Black women are often at a higher risk to contract these diseases than White women, but they also are at a higher risk to die from them as well. According to the American Cancer Society, the death rate for all cancers for Black women is 14% higher than that of White women. While the probability of being diagnosed with cancer in Black women is one in three, the chance of dying from cancer is one in five. Cancer is not the only disease that disproportionately affects African-American women. Black women are three times more likely to develop uterine fibroids. Lupus is two-three times more common in women of color, but more specifically one in every 537 Black women will have lupus. Black women are also at a higher chance of being overweight thus making them open to more obesity-related diseases.  There is also a racial disparity when it comes to pregnancy related deaths. While there are 12.4 deaths for every 100,000 births for White women, the statistics for Black women is 40.0 deaths for every 100,000 births. In a 2007 US study of five medical complications that are common causes of maternal death and injury, Black women were two to three times more likely to die than White women who had the same condition.  The World Health Organization in 2014 estimated that Black expectant and new mothers in the United States die at about the same rate as women in countries such as Mexico and Uzbekistan. A 2018 study found that "The sexual and reproductive health of African-American women has been compromised due to multiple experiences of racism, including discriminatory healthcare practices from slavery through the post-Civil Rights era." Another 2018 study found that darker skin tones were underrepresented in medical textbook imagery and that these omissions "may provide one route through which bias enters medical treatment".

Brazil

Black women make up 28% of the Brazilian population and still suffer discrimination in Brazil. The legacy of slavery and mistreatment of Black women during the Portuguese colonial era is still dealt with today. Interracial marriage between Black women and white Portuguese men was common in Brazil. Black women were often raped by white men in Brazil in effort to whiten the Brazilian population.

Famous leaders 

Some of the most important artistic and political leaders in history have been Black women. For instance, Queen Qalhata and Candace of Meroe are important, early African queens.

Thus far 21 Black women have been elected or appointed as head of a UN recognised state, all of which have been in Africa or in the Caribbean. The first Black woman to be appointed head of state, was Elisabeth Domitien who served as the Prime Minister of the Central African Republic from January 1975 to April 1976. The longest serving Black woman head of government was Eugenia Charles who served as the head of government for Dominica for nearly 15 years, from July 1980 to June 1995. President Ellen Johnson Sirleaf served as President of Liberia for 12 years.

In 2021, Ngozi Okonjo-Iweala became the first Black woman to lead a major multilateral organisation, when she was appointed Director-General of the World Trade Organization.

Four Black women have been awarded Nobel Prizes. Toni Morrison was the first Black woman to be awarded a Nobel Prize, when in 1993 she was awarded the prize for literature. Wangari Maathai was the first Black woman to win the Nobel Peace Prize which she received in 2004. Ellen Johnson Sirleaf and Leymah Gbowee shared the Nobel Peace Prize in 2011.

In the United States, Toni Morrison was the first Black woman Nobel laureate. Shirley Chisholm was an important Democratic candidate for U.S. President in the 1970s. In the 2020 United States presidential election, Kamala Harris was named Joe Biden's running mate, making her the first Black and South Asian woman to be on a major party ticket. Biden won the election, making Harris the first Black/South Asian person and Black/South Asian woman to be Vice President of the United States. With Justice Stephen Breyer's announcement of his intention to retire at the end of the 2021–22 term, President Joe Biden nominated Ketanji Brown Jackson to succeed him as Supreme Court justice. She was confirmed by the United States Senate in a 53-47 vote on April 7, 2022, and took her seat on June 30, 2022.

LGBT black women

One survey found that 23% of black women age 18 to 34 identity as bisexual in the United States. Black women are increasingly identifying as bisexual. Lesbian marriage is also increasing among black women. Black trans women often face high levels of discrimination.

See also

 African-American culture
 African-American women in the civil rights movement
 African-American women in computer science
 African-American women in politics
 African National Congress Women's League
 African Women's Union of the Congo
 Black feminism
 Black people
 Black women filmmakers
 Black women in the music industry
 Daughters of Africa
 List of African-American women in medicine
 Women of color
 Women in Africa
 Strong black woman
 Black women in ballet
 African and African-American women in Christianity

References

Further reading
 Blain, Keisha N., and Tiffany M. Gill (eds). To Turn the Whole World Over: Black Women and Internationalism (University of Illinois Press, 2019). 280 pp. online review.
 Blain, Keisha N. Set the World on Fire: Black Nationalist Women and the Global Struggle for Freedom (University of Pennsylvania Press, 2018).
 Busby, Margaret (ed.), New Daughters of Africa: An international anthology of writing by women of African (Myriad Editions, 2019).
 Coquery-Vidrovitc, Catherine. African Women: A Modern History (1997). 
 Hafkin, Nancy, and Edna G. Bay. Women in Africa: Studies in social and economic change (Stanford University Press, 1976).
 Harris-Perry, Melissa V. Sister Citizen: Shame, stereotypes, and Black women in America (Yale University Press, 2011).
 Hine, Darlene Clark, and Kathleen Thompson. A Shining Thread of Hope: The History of Black Women in America (1999).
 Hooks, Bell. Ain't I A Woman: Black Women and Feminism (Routledge, 2014).
 Jones, Jacqueline. Labor of Love, Labor of Sorrow: Black Women, Work, and the Family, from Slavery to the Present (2nd edn. 2010). 
 Nelson, Nicki. African Women in the Development Process (Routledge, 2013).
 Scales-Trent, Judy. "Black women and the constitution: Finding our place, asserting our rights." Harvard Civil Rights-Civil Liberties Law Review 24 (1989): 9–44. 
 Smith, Barbara (ed.), Home Girls: A Black Feminist Anthology (Rutgers University Press, 2000), primary sources.
 Stichter, Sharon B., and Jane Parpart. Patriarchy and Class: African women in the home and the workforce (Routledge, 2019).
 Strobel, Margaret. "African women." Signs: Journal of Women in Culture and Society 8.1 (1982): 109–131.
 Vaz, Kim Marie, ed. Black Women in America (Sage Publications, 1995).

Black (human racial classification)
People of African descent
Women by ethnicity